The women's 4 x 100 metres relay event at the 2011 All-Africa Games was held on 13 September.

Results

References
Results
Results
Maputo 2011: Nigeria Grabs Sprint Relay, Hurdles Gold, this day life, 2011-09-14.

Relay
2011 in women's athletics